Santos-Mateus-Leal syndrome, also known as Hirschsprung's disease-deafness-polydactyly syndrome is a very rare autosomal recessive limb malformation which is characterized by Hirschsprung's disease, feet and hand polydactyly, unilateral renal agenesis, and congenital hearing loss. Only 2 cases have been described in medical literature.

It was first discovered by Santos et al., when they described 2 siblings of the opposite sex born to consanguineous, first-cousin parents with the symptoms mentioned above, they (Santos et al.) came to the conclusion that this case was part of a separate novel syndrome different from a previous case report which described 2 male babies with Hirschsprung's disease, polydactyly and ventricular septal defect. This disorder is inherited in an autosomal recessive manner.

References 

Genetic diseases and disorders
Autosomal recessive disorders